Anthony Hawkins-Kay (born 19 May 1990) is a Jersey international cricketer. In 2014 he played in the 2014 ICC World Cricket League Division Four. He was selected in the Jersey squad for the 2015 ICC World Twenty20 Qualifier tournament and the 2016 ICC World Cricket League Division Four matches held in Los Angeles.

In April 2018, he was named in Jersey's squad for the 2018 ICC World Cricket League Division Four tournament in Malaysia.

In May 2019, he was named in Jersey's squad for the 2019 T20 Inter-Insular Cup against Guernsey. He made his Twenty20 International (T20I) debut for Jersey against Guernsey on 31 May 2019. The same month, he was named in Jersey's squad for the Regional Finals of the 2018–19 ICC T20 World Cup Europe Qualifier tournament in Guernsey. He finished the tournament as the joint-leading wicket-taker, with ten dismissals.

In September 2019, he was named in Jersey's squad for the 2019 ICC T20 World Cup Qualifier tournament in the United Arab Emirates. Ahead of the tournament, the International Cricket Council (ICC) named him as the key player in Jersey's squad. In June 2022, he was named in Jersey's squad for the 2022 Uganda Cricket World Cup Challenge League B tournament. He made his List A debut on 17 June 2022, against Uganda. Three days later, in Jersey's match against Kenya, he took his first five-wicket haul in List A cricket, with figures of 5/18.

References

External links
 

1990 births
Living people
Jersey cricketers
Jersey Twenty20 International cricketers
Place of birth missing (living people)